Prostitution in North Korea is illegal and is not visible to visitors. Allegedly, a collection of women called the kippumjo provided sexual entertainment to high-ranking officials until 2011. Meanwhile, some North Korean women who migrate to China become involved in prostitution.

Private prostitution

Under Article 261 of the criminal law, prostitution is punishable by up to two years labour if engaged in "multiple times". According to CIA analyst Helen-Louise Hunter, during the rule of Kim Il-sung, there was no organized prostitution, but some prostitution was still practiced discreetly near railroad stations and restaurants. While defectors currently report widespread prostitution, this is not experienced by visitors to the country.

Kippumjo

The kippŭmjo is an alleged collection of groups of approximately 2,000 women and girls that was maintained by the head of state of North Korea for the purpose of providing pleasure, mostly of a sexual nature, and entertainment for high-ranking Workers' Party of Korea (WPK) officials and their families, as well as occasionally distinguished guests. Its prostitutes were known as manjokcho ( "satisfaction team(s)") and were organised as a part of the kippŭmjo, who were drafted from among 14- to 20-year-old virgins, trained for about 20 months, and often "ordered to marry guards of Kim Jon-il or national heroes" when they are 25 years old.
For a girl selected to serve in the kippŭmjo, it was impossible to refuse, even if she was the daughter of a party official. Manjokcho were obliged to have sex with male high-ranking party officials. Their services were not available to most North Korean men. Not all kippŭmjo worked as prostitutes; other kippŭmjo activities were massaging and half-naked singing and dancing. The kippŭmjo were disbanded shortly after Kim Jong-il's death in 2011.

Sex trafficking

North Korea  is a source country for women and children who are subjected to sex trafficking. The United States Department of State Office to Monitor and Combat Trafficking in Persons ranks North Korea as a 'Tier 3' country.

Prostitution of North Koreans in China

Some North Korean women who migrate to China become prostitutes, either voluntarily or forcibly. According to the UN Commission of Inquiry on Human Rights, when the women are repatriated to North Korea, they are subjected to forced abortion and their mixed race children are subject to infanticide.

See also

Prostitution in South Korea
Prostitutes in South Korea for the U.S. military

References

Further reading
 Kim, Eunyoung, Mirang Park, Hue Williams. "A Case Study of Trafficking in North Korean Women in China". Paper presented at the annual meeting of the American Society of Criminology, Nov 13, 2007
 Yoon, Bang-Soon. "Sex-Trafficking and Human Rights of North Korean Women Defectors". Paper presented at the annual meeting of the International Studies Association 48th Annual Convention, USA, Feb 28, 2007

External links
Child exploitation not new to stricken region
Illegal Prostitution Occurring in Massage Parlors and Bathhouses